Gilbert Chu is an American biochemist. He is a Professor of Medicine (Oncology) and Biochemistry at the Stanford Medical School.

Biography
Chu graduated from Garden City High School in New York in 1963.  He received a B.A. in Physics from Princeton University in 1967, a Ph.D. in Physics from M.I.T. in 1973, and an M.D. from Harvard Medical School in 1980.

Chu joined the Stanford faculty in 1987.  His research has investigated how cells react to DNA damage from radiation. He has also developed electroporation techniques, a method for pulsed-field gel electrophoresis, and methods for analyzing microarray data.

Awards
Chu received the Clinical Scientist Award for Translational Research from Burroughs-Wellcome Fund (Wellcome Trust), and the Rita Allen Award from the Rita Allen Foundation. Chu was also elected as a Fellow of the American Physical Society for contributions at the intersection of physics and life sciences, including PET, electrophoresis, and statistical methods for microarrays. His other notable contributions include discovering and characterizing proteins involved in DNA repair and developing instrumentation for assessing toxicity associated with cancer chemotherapy.

Personal life
He married Sharon Rugel Long on August 9, 2008. Chu has two children, Alex and Jason.

His younger brother Steven Chu is a Nobel laureate and the twelfth United States Secretary of Energy in the Obama Administration. His other younger brother is the intellectual property attorney Morgan Chu.

Publications
Tusher V, Tibshirani R, Chu G "Significance analysis of microarrays applied to the ionizing radiation response"   Proc Natl Acad Sci USA 98 (9): 5116-5121 Apr 24, 2001 Times Cited: 12409
Tibshirani R, Hastie T, Narasimhan B, Chu G, "Diagnosis of multiple cancer types by shrunken centroids of gene expression" Proc Natl Acad Sci USA 99 (10): 6567-6572 May 14, 2002  Times Cited: 2789
Chu G, Vollrath D, Davis RW, "Separation of large DNA molecules by contour-clamped homogeneous electric fields" Science 234 (4783): 1582-1585 Dec 19, 1986  Times Cited: 1706
Chu G, Hayakawa H, Berg P "Electroporation for the efficient transfection of mammalian cells with DNA" Nucleic Acids Res 15 (3): 1311-1326 Feb 11 1987 Times Cited: 942 
Chu G, "Cellular responses to cisplatin - the roles of DNA-binding proteins and DNA-repair" J Biol Chem 269 (2): 787-790 Jan 14 1994  Times Cited: 833
Hwang BJ, Ford JM, Hanawalt PC, Chu G  "Expression of the p48 xeroderma pigmentosum gene is p53-dependent and is involved in global genomic repair" Proc Natl Acad Sci USA 96 (2), 424-428 Jan 19 1999  Times Cited: 640
Chu G, Chang E "Xeroderma pigmentosum group E cells lack a nuclear factor that binds to damaged DNA" Science 242 (4878), 564-567 Times Cited: 425
Smider V, Rathmell WK, Lieber MR, Chu G "Restoration of X-ray resistance and V (D) J recombination in mutant cells by Ku cDNA" Science 266 (5183): 288-291 Oct 14 1994  Times Cited: 360
Tang JY, Hwang BJ, Ford JM,  et al.  "Xeroderma pigmentosum p48 gene enhances global genomic repair and suppresses UV-induced mutagenesis" Molecular Cell 5 (4): 737-744 Apr 30 2000  Times Cited: 337

A complete listing of his publications can be found here.

References

External links
 Gil Chu lab webpage
 page at Stanford Medical School 
 Burroughs-Wellcome Fund

Living people
American biochemists
American people of Chinese descent
Fellows of the American Physical Society
Garden City High School (New York) alumni
Harvard Medical School alumni
MIT Department of Physics alumni
Princeton University alumni
Stanford University School of Medicine faculty
Year of birth missing (living people)